Friday is a 1995 American buddy comedy film directed by F. Gary Gray and written by Ice Cube and DJ Pooh. The first installment in the Friday trilogy, the film stars Ice Cube, Chris Tucker, Nia Long, Bernie Mac, Tiny "Zeus" Lister Jr., John Witherspoon, Regina King, and Anna Maria Horsford. Set in South Central Los Angeles, it follows unemployed friends Craig Jones and Smokey, who face troubles after becoming indebted to a local drug dealer.

While developing the film, Ice Cube and DJ Pooh expressed discontent regarding the portrayal of the hood in film, which they came to see as violent and menacing. As a result, they wished to counteract this, drawing on personal experiences when crafting the characters and plot points. Preparations for the film began after the pair were able to secure funding from New Line Cinema, who granted finance in exchange for a seasoned comedian in one of the lead roles; Ice Cube and DJ Pooh quickly settled on Tucker during casting. The film was Gray's film directorial debut, who was previously known as a music video director.

Friday was theatrically released in the United States on April 26, 1995. It received positive reviews from critics, many of whom praised the comedic sequences, writing, and acting performances. The film was also a commercial success, grossing $27 million worldwide. It then obtained a large cult following, inspiring internet memes and pop-culture references. It launched a media franchise with the sequels Next Friday (2000) and Friday After Next (2002).

Plot
Craig Jones, a recently fired and unemployed slacker, living in South Central Los Angeles, spends Friday with his best friend Smokey, a small-time drug peddler. The pair smoke a brokered consignment of marijuana, which Smokey was tasked to sell for Smokey's drug supplier Big Worm. 

Big Worm attempts to collect his money from Smokey, who accidentally involves Craig, subjecting both to Big Worm's ultimatum: if they don't repay him $200 by 10:00 PM that evening, Craig and Smokey will be killed.

Craig attempts to borrow money from a number of people, including his mother Betty, his sister Dana, and jealous girlfriend Joi, whom the latter refuses under the assumption that Craig is being unfaithful with local drug addict and mooch Felisha and sister, Debbie. Craig retrieves a gun to walk Smokey home, but his father Willie tells him that he needs to use his fists instead of weapons to help himself.

Smokey sells some drugs to Hector, a former smoking buddy, while Deebo, the neighborhood bully, forces Smokey to break into their neighbor Stanley's house to burglarize and they manage to steal $200 that Deebo decides to keep for himself.

Smokey attempts to retrieve the money from Deebo, who is asleep with Felisha at her house, but fails due to interference from the petty thief Ezal. Seeing Deebo awake, Craig and Smokey notice a car driving slowly and, suspecting a drive-by shooting, they hide in Craig's room for the evening. After failing to contact Big Worm, and with 10:00 PM approaching, they return outside, but are forced to evade Big Worm's men as they're sitting in a black van with its headlights off, starting a shootout.

After the shootout, the neighbors come out of their houses upon hearing the gunshots. Debbie confronts Deebo for beating Felisha, assuming Felisha was behind Smokey's attempted theft. As Craig and Smokey arrive, Deebo angrily punches Debbie, knocking her to the ground, leading to a physical altercation between him and Craig, with Craig being victorious. Smokey steals the $200 from the incapacitated Deebo. 

Other locals, such as Red and Ezal, retrieve their stolen items. Debbie tends to Craig's wounds, leading him to break up with Joi on the phone, while his father informs him his former supervisor called wanting to see him tomorrow.

Smokey settles his debt with Big Worm, telling him he will no longer sell drugs and is set to enter rehabilitation. Smokey then smokes a joint and ends the movie by looking at the camera and saying "I was just bullshittin'! And you know this, man!"

Cast

 Ice Cube as Craig Jones, a slacker.
 Chris Tucker as Smokey, Craig's friend who is a drug peddler.
 Nia Long as Debbie, a neighborhood girl.
 Bernie Mac as Pastor Clever
 Tiny "Zeus" Lister Jr. as Deebo, the neighborhood bully.
 John Witherspoon as Willie Jones, an animal control officer and Craig & Dana’s tough but well meaning father.
 Regina King as Dana Jones, the sister of Craig.
 Anna Maria Horsford as Betty Jones, the wife of Willie and the mother of Craig and Dana.
 Paula Jai Parker as Joi, the abusive girlfriend of Craig.
 Faizon Love as Big Worm, a drug supplier that Smokey works for.
 DJ Pooh as Red, one of Craig's neighbors whose bicycle was stolen by Deebo.
 Anthony Johnson as Ezal, a petty thief.
 Tony Cox as Mr. Parker
 Kathleen Bradley as Mrs. Parker
 Yvette Wilson as Rita
 Angela Means as Felisha, a drug addict and the sister of Debbie who lives with their parents and is a moocher.
 Vickilyn Reynolds as Joann, Smokey's mother.
 Demetrius Navarro as Hector, Smokey's smoking buddy.
 Reynaldo Rey as Red's father
 Ronn Riser as Stanley, one of Craig's neighbors.
 Justin Renover as Kid #1
 Meagan Good as Kid #2
 Terri J. Vaughn as China
 F. Gary Gray as a worker at a store

LaWanda Page cameos as a Jehovah's Witness that Craig shuts the door on. Michael Clarke Duncan appears in an uncredited role as a craps player; his film debut. Rap musician WC appears as a drive by shooter.

Production
Before Fridays release, movies such as Boyz n the Hood (also starring Ice Cube) and Colors portrayed life in the hood as violent and menacing. Ice Cube and DJ Pooh felt that these films did not portray the full picture of living in the hood, missing a more lighthearted element, with Ice Cube later saying, "we had fun in the hood. We used to trip off the neighborhood." Therefore, Cube and DJ Pooh decided to create a film that would portray that environment.

The script was only the third Ice Cube had ever written; the previous two were undeveloped. With the film, Ice Cube intended to make a "hood classic", one that could be "[watched] over and over and over again".<ref name="Throwawayline">{{cite magazine|last1=Grow|first1=Kory|title=Ice Cube Talks 'Friday': Bye Felicia' Is Such a Throwaway Line'|url=https://www.rollingstone.com/movies/features/ice-cube-talks-friday-bye-felicia-is-such-a-throwaway-line-20150420|magazine=Rolling Stone|date=April 20, 2015|access-date=April 11, 2017}}</ref> According to Ice Cube, a majority of the film is autobiographical, with much of it being based on events that occurred in his neighborhood growing up. Smokey was based on DJ Pooh's stint as a drug dealer, while Craig being fired on his day off was based on Ice Cube's cousin, who was working as a delivery driver for United Parcel Service (UPS) at the time.

Prior to writing, the duo realized their inexperience as filmmakers was unlikely to attract major film studios, and floated the idea of self-financing  the film. For a time, the idea of making the film in black and white to save money was considered, before the pair decided on approaching New Line Cinema about producing the film, who had achieved success with the House Party series; a film-type the duo aimed to replicate.

New Line Cinema agreed to finance the production, but requested that the role of Smokey, initially to be played by DJ Pooh, be played by someone with more experience. Chris Rock and Tommy Davidson were also considered for the role of Smokey. Ice Cube and Pooh immediately decided on Tucker, after discovering the comic through Def Comedy Jam. However, Tucker's first audition was poorly received, but was granted more time to try again at a later date. Tucker soon contacted Angela Means, aiming to work with her acting coach, but she invited him to a workshop session over dinner to help him secure the role. According to Means, "by the time that spaghetti was gone, Chris was Smokey."

Ice Cube was granted license to select the film's director, and decided on F. Gary Gray, who was a music video director. Gray had previously worked with Ice Cube on a number of occasions, and was also aiming to establish a foothold in Hollywood through a short film. Ice Cube instead offered him the role for Friday, attracted to the fact that he and Gray had similar backgrounds, feeling the director would accurately capture the film's aesthetic.

Gray said that Ice Cube starring in a comedy "scared the shit out of me," as he doubted whether audiences would buy into Cube portraying a role so different from his public persona. Gray explained, "Ice Cube was the toughest man in America, and when you take someone [who] delivers hard-hitting social issues in hardcore gangsta rap, and who has a hardcore view on politics, you would never think comedy."

ReleaseFriday was released on April 26, 1995, in the United States, June 30, 1995, in the United Kingdom, and October 5, 1995, in Australia. The film saw a limited, theatrical re-release in honor of its 20th anniversary on April 20, 2015, for one night only.

Home media
The film was released on VHS October 10, 1995, on DVD March 2, 1999, and Blu-ray on September 8, 2009, with a new director's cut (97 minutes). The single disc DVD contains a theatrical trailer, a featurette on the film, and cast and crew interviews.

ReceptionFriday grossed $6,589,341 on its opening weekend debuting at #2 in the box office in 865 theaters, averaging $7,617 per theater. The film grossed $27,467,564 in North America, against a budget of $3.5 million.

Rotten Tomatoes gives the film an approval rating of 76% based on 29 reviews, with an average rating of 6.4/10. The site's critical consensus reads, "What Friday might lack in taut construction or directorial flair, it more than makes up with its vibrant (albeit consistently crass) humor and the charming, energetic performances of its leads." Metacritic gives the film a score of 54 out of 100, based on 9 reviews, indicating "mixed or average reviews".

Legacy
The film has obtained a large cult following since its release. A scene in the film is the source of the internet meme "Bye, Felicia"—which is a phrase meant to dismiss an inconsequential person. Former Pittsburgh Steelers linebacker James Harrison and San Francisco 49ers wide receiver Deebo Samuel are both nicknamed Deebo in reference to the character from the film.

Director Quentin Tarantino counted Friday as one of his 20 favorite movies from 1992 to 2009.

Sequels
The film's success spawned two sequels: Next Friday (2000) and Friday After Next (2002). A fourth installment, tentatively titled Last Friday, has been in the works for several years. The film also inspired an animated series, titled Friday: The Animated Series, which aired in summer 2007.

The sequel Next Friday'' was the most successful in the franchise grossing a total of $59.8 million worldwide.

Soundtrack

See also
 List of hood films

References

External links

 
 

1995 films
1995 independent films
African-American comedy films
African-American films
American buddy comedy films
American independent films
1995 directorial debut films
American films about cannabis
American films about revenge
Cube Vision films
Films adapted into television shows
Films directed by F. Gary Gray
Films set in Los Angeles
Films shot in California
New Line Cinema films
Friday (franchise)
1990s hip hop films
Hood comedy films
Films with screenplays by Ice Cube
1990s buddy comedy films
1995 comedy films
1990s English-language films
Hood films
Stoner films
1990s American films